The 2007 Wofford Terriers football team was an American football team that represented Wofford College as a member of the Southern Conference (SoCon) during the 2007 NCAA Division I FCS football season. In their 20th year under head coach Mike Ayers, the Terriers compiled an overall record of 9–4 with a conference mark of 5–2, and finished as SoCon co-champion. Wofford advanced to the playoffs, where they defeated Montana before they lost to Richmond in the quarterfinals.

Schedule

References

Wofford
Wofford Terriers football seasons
Southern Conference football champion seasons
Wofford Terriers football